Tashreeq Matthews (born 12 September 2000), is a South African soccer player who plays as a midfielder for Varbergs BoIS.

Club career
In November 2018, Matthews signed for Borussia Dortmund. In January 2019, Matthews signed for Utrecht on loan.

International career
Matthews has represented South Africa at the under-20 level.

Career statistics

Club

Notes

References

2000 births
Living people
South African soccer players
South African expatriate soccer players
Association football midfielders
Eerste Divisie players
Allsvenskan players
Cape Town Spurs F.C. players
Borussia Dortmund players
Jong FC Utrecht players
Varbergs BoIS players
Expatriate footballers in Germany
South African expatriate sportspeople in Germany
Expatriate footballers in the Netherlands
South African expatriate sportspeople in the Netherlands
Expatriate footballers in Sweden
South African expatriate sportspeople in Sweden
South Africa youth international soccer players